A maggid shiur ( is the rabbi that lectures in a yeshiva or kollel. He usually lectures in one place, on a given topic, generally on advanced and in-depth Talmudic studies, on a fixed schedule.

The stature of a maggid shiur is a much sought-after position by the typical yeshiva student. The position is usually obtained by those well versed in the Talmud.

Elazar Shach told a future maggid shiur that the key to successful lectures is "knowing how to ask the initial questions that comprise the shiur."

Contrasting chavrusa with maggid shiur

While the chavrusa (study partner) system requires more commitment and participant preparation, a maggid shiur generally has more experience, and ideally "points out details" that both partners "never knew."

To succeed, both need "well defined goals."

References

Rabbis
Hebrew words and phrases